Mountain lacebark may refer to two New Zealand trees in the mallow family:-

Hoheria glabrata
Hoheria lyallii